Hè), also romanized as Ho, is a Chinese surname that is 71st in the list of the top 100 most common Chinese family names. The Chinese character 贺 means "celebrate" or "congratulate." According to a 2013 study, He was the 86th most common surname, shared by 2,740,000 people or 0.210% of the population, with the province with the most people being Hunan. It is the 70th name on the Hundred Family Surnames poem.

Origin
The surname originated as a semantic variant of Qing (庆), which can be traced back to Qing Feng (庆封), the great-grandson of Duke Huan of Qi. In the Eastern Han dynasty, a well-known official and descendant of the Qing family, Qing Chun (庆纯), changed his surname to He, which has the same meaning as Qing, because his surname Qing happened to be the given name of Liu Qing (刘庆), the father of the Emperor An of Han, in order to avoid a naming taboo

Another origin was a shortened form of disyllabic surnames such as He Lan (贺兰), He Lai (贺赖), He Dun (贺敦), which were from the Xianbei ethnic group, shortened to He through cultural fusion with the Han people during Northern and Southern dynasties

Notable people
 He Jingzhi (贺敬之, born 1924), politician and poet
 He Bingyan (贺炳炎; 1913 –  1960) was a general in the People's Liberation Army
He Mengfu (贺孟斧; (1911-1945) a Chinese film and theatre director from Wujin, Jiangsu
He Jiankui (贺建奎), Chinese scientist known for the Lulu and Nana gene editing controversy
He Zhizhang (贺知章), Tang Dynasty poet
He Long (贺龙), Chinese military leader and one of the Ten Marshals of the People's Republic of China
He Zizhen (贺子珍) third wife of Mao Zedong from May 1930 to 1937
He Guoqiang (贺国强) retired senior leader of the Chinese Communist Party
He Weifang (贺卫方), professor at Peking University
Mike He (賀軍翔), Taiwanese actor
Anna Mae He (贺梅 born 1999), an American child who was the subject of a custody battle between her Chinese biological parents and American adopted parents
 He Guan (贺惯; born 1993 in Tai'an) is a Chinese football player
 He Ying (revolutionary) (贺英), originally He Mingying (born 1886), was a Chinese revolutionary. She was born in Sangzhi, Hunan province
 He Zhonghan 賀衷寒, notable Koumingtang general that also served as Ministry of Transportation in Taiwan  
 He Junlin (贺峻霖), Chinese singer, member of Teens in Times

References

individual Chinese surnames